Leslie Moore may refer to:
Leslie King (footballer) (born 1963), New Zealand football player, also known as Leslie Moore
Leslie M. Moore, statistician at Los Alamos National Laboratory
Leslie Rowsell Moore (1912–2003), professor of geology at Sheffield University
Les Moore (1933–1992), English footballer